Kirkheaton railway station served the village of Kirkheaton, West Yorkshire, England until closure in 1930. It was located immediately north of the junction of Crossley Lane and School Lane, and was accessed from the latter. The line continued towards Kirkburton on a bridge across School Lane.

History
It was unusual in that it was operated by the London and North Western Railway company in an area where the Lancashire and Yorkshire Railway company had a virtual monopoly. Plans to extend the line to  never materialised and so Kirkburton remained at the end of the line. It was primarily used for the transportation of goods, although passenger services ran until 1930. The line continued to be used to transport goods until 1965, when a combination of road haulage and a decline in industry lead to closure.

Route

References

Disused railway stations in Kirklees
Former London and North Western Railway stations
Railway stations in Great Britain opened in 1868
Railway stations in Great Britain closed in 1930